Buddy Duress is an American actor known for his roles in Heaven Knows What, Good Time, and Person to Person. A native of Queens, Duress has become a frequent collaborator of the Safdie brothers.

Filmography

Film

Television

References 

Living people
Male actors from New York City
Year of birth missing (living people)
21st-century American male actors